Tou Feggariou Anapnoes (Greek: Του Φεγγαριού Αναπνοές; English: The Breaths Of The Moon) is the fourth studio album by Greek artist, Katy Garbi. It was released on 16 October 1992 by Sony Music Greece and received gold certification, selling over 40,000 units*. The album showcased a significant change over Katy's repertoire, as it featured Greek laika elements mixed with pop, and contains her first breakthrough hit "Pes To M' Ena Fili".

In 1992, gold was the album whose sales exceeded 30,000 units.

Track listing

Singles 
The following singles were officially released to radio stations with music videos and gained a lot of airplay.

"Tou Feggariou Anapnoes" (The Breaths Of The Moon)
"Pes To M' Ena Fili" (Say It With A Kiss)
"Zilia Mou" (My Jealousy)
"Den Einai I Proti Fora" (It's Not The First Time)
"S' Agapo Pio Poli" (I Love You Even More)
"Lathos Porta" (Wrong Door)

Credits 
Credits adapted from liner notes.

Personnel 
Charis Andreadis – orchestration (tracks: 7, 8, 9, 10)
Giannis Bithikotsis – bouzouki (tracks: 9) / cura (tracks: 7, 9)
Stelios Goulielmos – backing vocals (tracks: 8, 10)
Antonis Gounaris – guitars (tracks: 7, 8, 9, 10) / oud (tracks: 7, 8)
Tolis Ketselidis – programming, keyboards (tracks: 1, 2, 3, 4, 5, 6, 7, 9, 10)
Elina Konstantopoulou – backing vocals (tracks: 1, 2, 3, 6)
Stefanos Korkolis – accordion (tracks: 1)
Fanis Mezinis – backing vocals (tracks: 1, 2, 3, 6)
Spiros Pazios – orchestration, programming, keyboards, guitars (tracks: 1, 2, 3, 4, 5, 6)
Nikos Terzis – programming, keyboards (tracks: 8)
Eva Tselidou – backing vocals (tracks: 8, 10)
Marianna Zorba – backing vocals (tracks: 8, 10)

Production 
Giannis Doxas – art direction
Ntinos Diamantopoulos – photographer
Giannis Doulamis – production manager
Giannis Ioannidis (Digital Press Hellas) – mastering
Tolis Ketselidis (Libra studio) – sound engineer, mix engineer
Athina Lekakou – photographer

References 

1992 albums
Katy Garbi albums
Greek-language albums
Sony Music Greece albums